Pearl Wedro was a Polish-Canadian trade union organizer and Communist Party of Canada activist. Wedro was a lifelong activist in the Jewish labour movement. In 1931, she was taken to hospital with gash in her
head needing stitches after being assaulted by a scab during a strike in Winnipeg.

References

Year of birth missing
Year of death missing
Members of the Communist Party of Canada
Canadian women trade unionists
Jewish trade unionists
Polish emigrants to Canada